Masukawa (written: 益川) is a Japanese surname. Notable people with the surname include:

, Japanese footballer
, Japanese theoretical physicist
, Japanese voice actor

Japanese-language surnames